The  ceremony was held by the Japan Academy Prize Association to honor its selection of the best films of 2008 on February 20, 2009. NTV broadcast the event, which took place at the Grand Prince Hotel New Takanawa in Tokyo, Japan. The nominations for the Awards were announced on December 18, 2008.

Nominees

Awards

References

External links 
  - 
 The 32nd Japan Academy Prize - 

Japan Academy Film Prize
Japan Academy Film Prize
Japan Academy Prize
February 2009 events in Japan